Victor Henry Forster (1917-2009) was an Irish Anglican priest: he was Archdeacon of Clogher from 1983 to 1989.

Forster was educated at Trinity College, Dublin  and ordained in 1946. After  curacies at Magheralin and Garrison he held incumbencies at Killeevan, Rathgraffe and Aghalurcher.

References

1917 births
2009 deaths
Archdeacons of Clogher
Alumni of Trinity College Dublin
20th-century Irish Anglican priests
21st-century Irish Anglican priests